Ramlösa Södra FF is a Swedish football club from Helsingborg. On 2 March 2013 the club changed name from Ramlösa FF to Ramlösa Södra FF.

Background
The club was founded on 24 November 2007 following the merger of the Helsingborgs Södra BIS and Ramlösa BoIS clubs.  Before the merger Helsingborg Södra played football in Division 2 Södra Götaland and Ramlösa BoIS in Division 6. Following the merger the club runs two teams – one that plays in Division 2 under the name Ramlösa Södra FF and the other which plays in Division 6 under the name Ramlösa FF.  Helsingborg Södra used to play in red and Ramlösa BoIS in blue, so it is logical that new club colours were chosen as red and blue stripes.

Since their foundation Ramlösa Södra FF has participated in the middle divisions of the Swedish football league system.  The club currently plays in Division 2 Västra Götaland which is the fourth tier of Swedish football. Ramlösa Södra FF play their home games at Heden IP in Helsingborg while Ramlösa FF play their home games at Ättekulla IP.

Ramlösa Södra FF were affiliated to the Skånes Fotbollförbund.

Season to season

Footnotes

External links
 Ramlösa Södra FF – Official website

Football clubs in Skåne County
Football in Helsingborg
Association football clubs established in 2007
2007 establishments in Sweden